This article details Trailer Nos. 42 – 44 of the Manx Electric Railway on the Isle of Man.

Dating from 1903 and supplied by G.F. Milnes & Co., these three trailers are of similar design to their sisters and seat 44 passengers; they remain in service, or available for service subject to demand, today. These carriages are often seen being pulled by winter saloon trams 19, 20, 21 and 22.

References

Sources
 Manx Manx Electric Railway Fleetlist (2002) Manx Electric Railway Society
 Island Island Images: Manx Electric Railway Pages (2003) Jon Wornham
 Official Official Tourist Department Page (2009) Isle Of Man Heritage Railways

Manx Electric Railway